Pope Adeodatus can refer to:
Pope Adeodatus I (615 to 618)
Pope Adeodatus II (672 to 676)

Adeodatus